Leiophora innoxia is a European species of fly in the family Tachinidae.

Distribution
China, British Isles, Czech Republic, Hungary, Moldova, Poland, Slovakia, Ukraine, Norway, Sweden, Bosnia & Herzegovina, Italy, Serbia, Slovenia, Austria, Belgium, France, Germany, Switzerland, Mongolia, Russia, Transcaucasia.

References

Insects described in 1824
Diptera of Europe
Diptera of Asia
Exoristinae
Taxa named by Johann Wilhelm Meigen